Cristy is a given name and surname. Notable people with the name include:

 Cristy Fermin (born 1958), Filipino talk show host
 Cristy Lane (born 1940), American country and gospel singer
 Cristy Thom (born 1971), American model, actress, and artist
 Austin P. Cristy (1850–1926), American newspaper publisher
 James Cristy (1913–1989), American swimmer

See also
 Christy (disambiguation)
 Crist (surname)
 Crista (disambiguation)
 Cristi, name
 Kristy, given name

Feminine given names